Got You on My Mind is the third studio album released by American country artist, Jean Shepard. The album was issued in February 1961 on Capitol Records and was produced by Ken Nelson. The album would be one of a series of albums Shepard would record for the Capitol label during the sixties. Although the album did not spawn singles, it was one of country music's first records by a female artist.

Background and content 
Got You on My Mind was recorded in three separate studio sessions between April 4 and April 11, 1960. This was one of Shepard's first albums not to be recorded on the west coast in California. Instead, sessions for the album were held at the Bradley Film and Recording Studio in Nashville, Tennessee. Ken Nelson, a renowned west coast country figure, produced Got You on My Mind and was a producer of Shepard's previous sessions on the Capitol label. Background musicians (personnel) for Got You on My Mind consisted of The Nashville A-Team. These musicians played on many Nashville recording sessions during the late 1950s and early 1960s, including many of Shepard's. Songs chosen for the album were a variety of new material and covers of songs by other music artists. Included in the record were cover versions of George Jones's "Waltz of the Angels", Buck Owens' "Under Your Spell Again", and the folk song "Big Midnight Special".

Release 
Got You on My Mind was officially released a year after it was recorded in February 1961. It became Shepard's third studio album and fourth album to be issued under Capitol Records. The official album consisted of twelve tracks and was originally released on Vinyl. Singles were not spawned from the original release of the record. Additionally, the record did not chart on any Billboard record list. Got You on My Mind was issued on CD on the Avid label.

Track listing 
Side one
"Big Midnight Special" – (Traditional)
"Blues Stay Away from Me" – (Alton Delmore, Henry Glover, Wayne Raney)
"Waltz of the Angels" – (Dick Reynolds, Jack Rhodes)
"Another (Just Like Me)" – (Roy Drusky, Vic McAlpin)
"One White Rose" – (Shorty Long, Dick Wentzel)
"I Don't Apologize for Loving You" – (Velma Burns)

Side two
"Under Your Spell Again" – (Buck Owens, Dusty Rhodes)
"You're the Only Good Thing" – (Chuck Gregory, Jack Toombs)
"Got You on My Mind" – (Howard Biggs, Joe Thomas)
"If You Haven't You Can't Feel the Way You Do" – (Bill Carver)
"Mockin' Bird Hill" – (Vaughn Horton)
"The Color Song (I Lost My Love)" – (Dewey Bergman, Milton Leeds, Fred Wise)

Personnel 
 Floyd Cramer – piano
 Ray Edenton – rhythm guitar
 Buddy Harman – drums
 Walter Haynes – steel guitar
 Roy Huskey – bass
 Grady Martin – guitar
 Bob Moore – bass
 Jean Shepard – lead vocals, background vocals

References 

1961 albums
Jean Shepard albums
Capitol Records albums
Albums produced by Ken Nelson (United States record producer)